Northmoor Green is a village in south central Somerset, England, that is more commonly known as Moorland, and sometimes mistakenly called Fordgate even though it is a separate hamlet. These places being hamlets of Moorland in the civil parish of North Petherton.

It is the only village in the United Kingdom with two official names on an OS Map (Northmoor Green or Moorland)

Set in the heart of the Somerset levels it has the River Parrett running next to it. It has fewer local amenities than it used to; the village shop, school and post office have closed leaving only a church, village hall and an out of village pub, The Thatchers Arms. The church of St Peter and St John was built in the 1840s.

The Village Hall was built to celebrate the coronation of Queen Elizabeth II.  It was originally started by the villagers themselves, but had to be pulled down and rebuilt by professional builders, as the walls were not straight.  Dances used to be held in it once a month, with refreshments provided by the local Women's Institutes.

Before the hall was built, a small amateur dramatic society, The Parrett Players, produced two one-act plays which were held in the local school.

The village gained nationwide recognition in February 2014 due to extensive flooding on the Somerset Levels which particularly affected Moorland, when the Environment Agency constructed an earth bank to try to hold back the water.

Moorland Court Farmhouse was built in the early 19th century. It is a Grade II listed building. Winslade Farmhouse which is also listed dates from the 17th century, as does Moorland Cottage.

North Moor to the south of the village is a 676.3 hectare biological Site of Special Scientific Interest. The low-lying area is drained by a series of ditches and the Northmoor Pumping Station.

Serious flooding occurred during the Winter flooding of 2013–14 on the Somerset Levels. The Church of St Peter and St John was closed for two years following the flooding and reopened in January 2016.

References

External links
GENUKI(tm) page

Villages in Sedgemoor
North Petherton